Dihua Jiang is a professor of mathematics at the University of Minnesota working in number theory, automorphic forms, and the Langlands program.

Early life and education
In 1958, Jiang was born in the Lucheng District of Wenzhou, Zhejiang. He studied at Wenzhou No. 3 Middle School before studying at Zhejiang Normal University, where he received his bachelor's degree in mathematics in 1982. He received a master's degree from East China Normal University in 1987 and a PhD in mathematics from Ohio State University in 1994 under the supervision of Stephen Rallis.

Career
Jiang joined the faculty at the Department of Mathematics at the University of Minnesota in 1998 and became a full professor in 2004.

Awards
Jiang was a recipient of a Sloan Research Fellowship and was inducted as a Fellow of the American Mathematical Society in 2019.

Selected publications
Degree 16 standard L-function of GSp(2)×GSp(2). Mem. Amer. Math. Soc. 123 (1996), no. 588, viii+196 pp.
 With Ilya Piatetski-Shapiro: Arithmeticity of discrete subgroups and automorphic forms. Geom. Funct. Anal. 8 (1998), no. 3, 586–605.
With Wee Teck Gan and Nadya Gurevich: Cubic unipotent Arthur parameters and multiplicities of square integrable automorphic forms. Invent. Math. 149 (2002), no. 2, 225-265.
With David Soudry: The local converse theorem for SO(2n+1) and applications. Annals of Mathematics (2) 157 (2003), no. 3, 743-806. 
With David Ginzburg and Stephen Rallis: On the nonvanishing of the central value of the Rankin-Selberg L-functions. J. Amer. Math. Soc. 17 (2004), no. 3, 679–722.
On the fundamental automorphic L-functions of SO(2n+1). Int. Math. Res. Not. 2006, Art. ID 64069, 26 pp.
With Jian-Shu Li and Shou-Wu Zhang: Periods and distribution of cycles on Hilbert modular varieties. Pure Appl. Math. Q. 2 (2006), no. 1, Special Issue: In honor of John H. Coates. Part 1, 219–277.
With Binyong Sun and Chen-Bo Zhu: Uniqueness of Bessel models: the Archimedean case. Geom. Funct. Anal. 20 (2010), no. 3, 690–709.
Automorphic integral transforms for classical groups I: Endoscopy correspondences. Automorphic forms and related geometry: assessing the legacy of I. I. Piatetski-Shapiro, 179–242, Contemp. Math., 614, Amer. Math. Soc., Providence, RI, 2014.
With Chufeng Nien and Shaun Stevens: Towards the Jacquet conjecture on the local converse problem for p-adic GLn. J. Eur. Math. Soc. (JEMS) 17 (2015), no. 4, 991–1007. 
With Lei Zhang: Arthur parameters and cuspidal automorphic modules of classical groups. Annals of Mathematics (2) 191 (2020), no. 3, 739-827.
With Baiying Liu and Bin Xu: A reciprocal branching problem for automorphic representations and global Vogan packets. J. Reine Angew. Math. 765 (2020), 249–277.

References

External links
 

20th-century Chinese mathematicians
21st-century American mathematicians
Number theorists
Living people
Date of birth missing (living people)
Place of birth missing (living people)
1958 births
Educators from Wenzhou
Ohio State University alumni
Zhejiang Normal University alumni
East China Normal University alumni
University of Minnesota faculty
Fellows of the American Mathematical Society
Mathematicians from Zhejiang